Edward Stefan Kłosiński (2 January 1943, in Warsaw – 5 January 2008, in Milanówek) was a Polish cinematographer.

Life and work

Kłosiński completed his studies at the National Film School in Lodz in 1967. His screen debut came in 1972; in 1973 he worked for the first time with Krzysztof Zanussi. Andrzej Wajda hired him in 1974 for the debut of his first film, The Promised Land.

Since his work with Wajda in the 1970s Kłosiński became one of the foremost Polish cinematographers, enjoying international success. Besides that film, he also worked as lighting director for theatre productions by Wajda, Magda Umer, Andrzej Domalik, and Krystyna Janda. In Germany, he regularly worked with Dieter Wedel. He later married Janda.  The last film he did before his death was 2007's Love Comes Lately.

Kłosiński died on 5 January 2008 in Milanówek of lung cancer. He is buried in the Evangelical Cemetery of the Augsburg Confession in Warsaw.

Filmography
 1997: An Air So Pure
 2000: Life as a Fatal Sexually Transmitted Disease
 2000: The Farewell
 2002: Chopin: Desire for Love
 2002: Gebürtig
 2002: The Supplement
 2005: Persona Non Grata
 2007: Love Comes Lately

Awards

1999 Bavarian Film Award, Best Cinematography

External links

1943 births
2008 deaths
Polish cinematographers
Polish Lutherans
Deaths from lung cancer
Deaths from cancer in Poland
20th-century Lutherans